Libice nad Cidlinou is a municipality and village in Nymburk District in the Central Bohemian Region of the Czech Republic. It has about 1,200 inhabitants. It is one of the oldest settlements in Bohemia.

Geography
It lies in the Central Elbe Table lowland within the Polabí region. The village is situated on the right bank of the Cidlina River, near its confluence with the Elbe.

History

According to pottery finds, a Slavic settlement was established here in the 6th century. Libice emerged in the 9th century as the capital gord of the Slavník family. The first written mention of Libice is from 981 and relates to a mention from the Chronica Boemorum.

In 995, Libice was stormed by Bohemian Duke Boleslaus II (Přemyslid) and the Vršovci clan, who killed most of the Slavník family and annexed Libice to Prague. Adalbert of Prague and his brother, Archbishop Radim Gaudentius, survived by taking refuge in land of the Polans under rule of Boleslaus II.

In the 11th century, the gord survived and continued to function as an important administrative centre of Bohemia. In 1108, Božej of the Vršovci family lived here as a castellan. In 1130, Libice was destroyed by a large fire. The village was renewed, but the gord disappeared, and the stones from it served as building material for the villagers. According to deeds from 1228 and 1233, the village was then owned by the St. George's Convent in Prague. In 1336, the convent sold Libice to Ješek of Všechlapy.

Demographics

Transport
The D11 motorway passes through the municipality.

Sights
On the western edge of the village lies the area of Slavník gord with models of the foundations of the Ottonian church from the 10th century and the palace from the 11th century. A bronze statue of Saint Adalbert of Prague and Radim Gaudentius stands in front of the foundations of the church. In 1961, the area was declared an archaeological monument reserve. Since 1989, the acropolis of the gord has been a national cultural monument.

Other sights in Libice include the Church of St. Adalbert and the Evangelical church. The Church of St. Adalbert dates from the 14th century, but was rebuilt to its current form in 1836.

Notable people
Adalbert of Prague  (c. 956–997), bishop, missionary, and martyr

References

External links

Villages in Nymburk District
Archaeological sites in the Czech Republic